Athymoris liukueiensis is a moth in the family Lecithoceridae. It is endemic to Taiwan.

The wingspan is 18–19 mm. The forewings are ochreous white with dark streaks along the cell and veins and a large dark brown spot at the end of the cell. There are dark brown scales along the inner margin of the termen.

Etymology
The species name refers to the type locality.

References

Athymoris
Moths of Taiwan
Endemic fauna of Taiwan
Moths described in 2000